The 1976 Brazilian Grand Prix was a Formula One motor race held at Interlagos in São Paulo, Brazil on 25 January 1976. It was the opening round of the 1976 Formula One season. The race was the fifth Brazilian Grand Prix and the fourth to be held for the World Drivers' Championship. The race was held over 40 laps of the 7.87-kilometre circuit for a total race distance of 315 kilometres.

The race was won by defending world champion, Niki Lauda, driving a Ferrari 312T. The Austrian driver won his eighth Formula One Grand Prix by 28 seconds over French driver Patrick Depailler in a Tyrrell 007. Second place was Depailler's best finish in almost two years having finished second previously at the 1974 Swedish Grand Prix. Tom Pryce finished third in a Shadow DN5B in his second podium in six months. It would prove to be the season highlight for Pryce and for Shadow Racing Cars. It was their only podium for the season and Pryce would not stand on the podium again.

Qualifying

Qualifying classification

Race

Summary 
For the opening round of the season, James Hunt took his first Formula 1 pole position with reigning champion Niki Lauda alongside in his Ferrari. Emerson Fittipaldi qualified fifth on his debut for his brother Wilson's Copersucar team. Clay Regazzoni in the second Ferrari took the lead at the start. Lotus teammates Andretti and Peterson collided on the first lap, both retiring as a result. Lauda was still in the lead ahead of Hunt and Jarier. Hunt crashed out due to a sticking throttle, and Jarier did the same a lap later after driving on some oil in the track from Hunt's car. Fittipaldi's debut race for Copersucar failed to live up to its initial promise, the Brazilian double world champion ending up three laps down after various technical problems. Lauda thus started his title defence with victory, with Patrick Depailler second in the Tyrrell, and Tom Pryce completing the podium in the other Shadow.

Classification

Championship standings after the race

Drivers' Championship standings

Constructors' Championship standings

Note: Only the top five positions are included for both sets of standings.

References

Brazilian Grand Prix
Brazilian Grand Prix
Grand Prix
Brazilian Grand Prix